The Burney Collection consists of over 1,270 17th-18th century newspapers and other news materials, gathered by Charles Burney, most notable for the 18th-century London newspapers. The original collection, totalling almost 1 million pages, is held by the British Library.

Contents of the collection

Highlights
Key objects in the collection include:
The financial scandal of the 1720s, the South Sea bubble, with reports in the Weekly Journal or Saturday’s Post of how Parliament decided that if they left the country, the directors of the South Sea company "shall suffer death as a felon without benefit of clergy and forfeit to the King all his Lands, Goods and Chattels whatsoever."
First advertisement for The Memoirs of Fanny Hill in the Whitehall Evening Post, 6 March 1750, and then, in the issue of 17 March, a report of how the publisher was taken into custody and all copies were seized.
 Insight into English attitudes to contemporary events, such as when the English Chronicle, or, Universal Evening Post used the unusual device of a headline –  FRENCH REVOLUTION!! –  for a whole page article on 18 of July 1789. It reported sympathetically on the fall of the Bastille four days earlier, including how the officers were decapitated in ‘a sad but necessary spectacle...a solemnity worthy of the highest admiration.’

Summary
The collection begins with Parliamentary papers from 1603, and newspapers from the early 1620s. 18th-century London newspapers are the richest part of the collection.

The following is an incomplete list of titles covering some of the most popular.
 Parliamentary papers from 1603 
 London Newspapers
 The Daily Courant * (1702-1735), the first daily newspaper published in London
 The London Gazette * from 1665
 London Chronicle *
 London Evening Post *
 Lloyd's Evening Post and British Chronicle *
 Evening Post *
 Daily Post *
 Morning Chronicle and London Advertiser *
 National papers
 The Era
 Periodicals
 Tatler (1709-1711)
 Spectator (1711-1712)
 English provincial titles from 1712
 The Stamford Mercury of 1728, 
 The Leeds Mercury *
 The Exeter Flying Post *
 Irish newspapers from 1691
 The Dublin Intelligence of 1691
 The Belfast News–Letter *
 Scottish newspapers from 1708
 The Aberdeen Journal *
 The Caledonian Mercury *
 The Echo or Edinburgh Weekly Journal *
 Many 18th-century American newspapers, including:
 The New England Courant (1721-1723), on which Benjamin Franklin worked
 (unsorted in this list)
 British Journal *
 Daily Gazetteer *
 General Advertiser *
 Lounger *
 Mirror *
 St James' Chronicle or British Evening Post *
 Whitehall Evening Post or London Intelligencer *
 Daily News
 Morning Chronicle
 Illustrated Police News
 The Chartist

* These items are available as part of the online collection.

Preservation and access

Microfilm
Due to rapid deterioration of the collection, a decision was made to microfilm the collection and restrict access to physical copies. The success of the microfilm project led to many other book collections being preserved on film.

Access to the collection 
 The Joint Information Systems Committee provides free online access to the collection for all UK Further and Higher Education institutions.

See also 
 History of British newspapers
 JISC Digitisation Programme
 List of online newspaper archives
 List of newspapers in the United Kingdom

References

Sources

External links
 http://www.bl.uk/reshelp/findhelprestype/news/newspdigproj/burney/index.html
 https://web.archive.org/web/20091018055510/http://www.nls.uk/collections/digital/resources/burney.html
 http://microformguides.gale.com/BrowseGuide.asp?colldocid=1003000&Page=23&Item=
 http://www.bl.uk/reshelp/findhelprestype/webres/newspaperliblinks/index.html
 http://www.jisc.ac.uk/whatwedo/programmes/digitisation/newspapers2.aspx

Documents
British Library collections
Burney Collection
History of newspapers